Kevin Ashcroft (born 5 June 1944) is a former professional rugby league footballer who played in the 1960s and 1970s, and coached in the 1970s, 1980s and 1990s. Ashcroft is a Warrington Hall of Fame inductee.

Playing career

Rochdale Hornets
Ashcroft played  in Rochdale Hornets' 5-16 defeat by Warrington in the 1965 Lancashire County Cup Final during the 1965–66 season at Knowsley Road, St. Helens on Friday 29 October 1965.

Leigh
Ashcroft played  in Leigh's 5-8 defeat by Castleford in the 1967 BBC2 Floodlit Trophy Final during the 1967–68 season at Headingley Rugby Stadium, Leeds on Saturday 16 January 1968, played  in the 11-6 victory over Wigan in the 1969 BBC2 Floodlit Trophy Final during the 1969–70 season at Central Park, Wigan on Tuesday 16 December 1969.

He played  in Leigh's 2-11 defeat by Swinton in the 1969 Lancashire County Cup Final during the 1969–70 season at Central Park, Wigan on Saturday 1 November 1969, and played  in the 7-4 victory over St. Helens in the 1970 Lancashire County Cup Final during the 1970–71 season at Station Road, Swinton on Saturday 28 November 1970.

Ashcroft played  in Leigh's 24-7 victory over Leeds in the 1971 Challenge Cup Final during the 1970–71 season at Wembley Stadium, London on Saturday 15 May 1971, in front of a crowd of 85,514.

Warrington
He played  in Warrington's 24-9 victory over Featherstone Rovers in the 1974 Challenge Cup Final during the 1973–74 season at Wembley Stadium, London on Saturday 11 May 1974, in front of a crowd of 77,400, and played  in the 7-14 defeat by Widnes in the 1975 Challenge Cup Final during the 1974–75 season at Wembley Stadium, London on Saturday 10 May 1975, in front of a crowd of 85,998.

He played  in Warrington's 0-0 draw with by Salford in the 1974 BBC2 Floodlit Trophy Final during the 1974–75 season at The Willows, Salford on Tuesday 17 December 1974, played  in the 5-10 defeat by Salford in the 1974 BBC2 Floodlit Trophy Final replay during the 1974–75 season at Wilderspool Stadium, Warrington on Tuesday 28 January 1975.

Ashcroft played , was captain, and was man of the match in Warrington's 27-16 victory over Rochdale Hornets in the 1973–74 Player's No.6 Trophy Final during the 1973–74 season at Central Park, Wigan on Saturday 9 February 1974, Ashcroft gave his £25 man of the match prize to Wigan's groundsman Billy Mitchell who had managed to get the water-logged pitch into a playable condition, (based on increases in average earnings, this would be approximately £442.70 in 2014).

Ashcroft played  in Warrington's 4-0 victory over Featherstone Rovers in the 1973–74 Captain Morgan Trophy Final during the 1973–74 season at The Willows, Salford on Saturday 26 January 1974, in front of a crowd of 5,259.

Return to Leigh
Ashcroft played , was the coach, and scored a drop goal in Leigh's 4-12 defeat by Castleford in the 1976 BBC2 Floodlit Trophy Final during the 1976–77 season at Hilton Park, Leigh on Tuesday 14 December 1976.

International honours
On 3 April 1965, Ashcroft played in the first ever Great Britain under-24 international match in a 17–9 win against France under-24's.

Ashcroft won caps for Great Britain while at Leigh in the 1968 Rugby League World Cup against Australia, in 1968 against France, in 1969 against France, in the 1970 Rugby League World Cup against France, and New Zealand, and on the 1974 Great Britain Lions tour against New Zealand (interchange/substitute).

Coaching career

County Cup Final appearances
Ashcroft was the coach in Warrington's 16–0 victory over St. Helens in the 1982 Lancashire County Cup Final during the 1982–83 season at Central Park, Wigan on Saturday 23 October 1982, and the coach in Salford's 17–22 defeat by Wigan in the 1988 Lancashire County Cup Final during the 1988–89 season at Knowsley Road, St. Helens on Sunday 23 October 1988.

References

Last of the Dinosaurs: The Kevin Ashcroft Story

External links
!Great Britain Statistics at englandrl.co.uk (statistics currently missing due to not having appeared for both Great Britain, and England)
Statistics at wolvesplayers.thisiswarrington.co.uk
Statistics at wolvesplayers.thisiswarrington.co.uk (martini)
 (archived by web.archive.org) Statistics at wolvesplayers.thisiswarrington.co.uk
 (archived by web.archive.org) Statistics at wolvesplayers.thisiswarrington.co.uk (martini)

1944 births
Living people
Blackpool Panthers coaches
Dewsbury Rams players
English rugby league coaches
English rugby league players
Great Britain national rugby league team players
Lancashire rugby league team players
Leigh Leopards captains
Leigh Leopards coaches
Leigh Leopards players
Rochdale Hornets players
Rugby league hookers
Rugby league players from St Helens, Merseyside
Rugby league props
Salford Red Devils coaches
Salford Red Devils players
Warrington Wolves coaches
Warrington Wolves players